The men's freestyle bantamweight competition at the 1932 Summer Olympics in Los Angeles took place from 1 August to 3 August at the Grand Olympic Auditorium. Nations were limited to one competitor. This weight class was limited to wrestlers weighing up to 56 kg.

This freestyle wrestling competition did not use the single-elimination bracket format previously used for Olympic freestyle wrestling but instead followed the format that was introduced at the 1928 Summer Olympics for Greco-Roman wrestling, using an elimination system based on the accumulation of points. Each round featured all wrestlers pairing off and wrestling one bout (with one wrestler having a bye if there were an odd number). The loser received 3 points. The winner received 1 point if the win was by decision and 0 points if the win was by fall. At the end of each round, any wrestler with at least 5 points was eliminated.

Schedule

Results

Round 1

Two wrestlers won by fall, advancing with 0 points. Two won by decision, moving to the second round with 1 point. Four lost, receiving 3 points.

 Bouts

 Points

Round 2

Jaskari won his second bout by fall, remaining at 0 points. Zervinis, the other wrestler with 0 points after one round, lost to move to 3 points. Pearce had a second consecutive win by decision, adding a second point, while Depuichaffray's loss added 3 points to his previous 1. Of the first-round losers, Zombori and Reid survived; the former won by fall to stay at 3 points while the latter earned a 4th point by winning by decision. Trifunov and Wingren each lost their second bout and were eliminated.

 Bouts

 Points

Round 3

All three bouts were won by decision in this round. All three winners earned medals, as the three losers were eliminated.

 Bouts

 Points

Final round

Pearce's win over Jaskari put all four wrestlers at 4 points. Zombori and Jaskari had not yet faced each other, while Pearce had wrestled both men and won. The bout between Zombori and Jaskari was therefore effectively a silver/bronze bout. Zombori won by decision to take the silver medal.

 Bouts

 Points

References

Wrestling at the 1932 Summer Olympics